Ethiopian manuscripts are known to have reached Europe as early as the fifteenth century, perhaps even earlier, through Egypt, Ethiopian pilgrims to the Holy Land and through members of the Ethiopian monastery of St Stephen of the Abyssinians in Rome. Subsequently, travellers, missionaries, military personnel and scholars contributed to the development of collections outside Ethiopia. In Europe, the three biggest collections of Ethiopian manuscripts are in Rome (Biblioteca Apostolica Vatican), in Paris (Bibliothèque nationale de France) and in London (British Library). These three organisations together hold about 2,700 manuscripts. Oriental collections of nearly all significant European libraries also have Ethiopian material, with some still pursuing a policy of acquisition. The five largest collections in North America are at Catholic University, the Library of Congress, UCLA, Princeton, and Howard University.

Monasteries and modern institutions in Ethiopia have, meanwhile, maintained extensive collections and in some cases are still centres of manuscript production. Parchment (berānnā) was used for Ethiopian manuscripts from the time of the Four Gospels books of Abbā Garimā. Apart from Islamic manuscripts, paper only came into general use twentieth century.

There are eighty eight languages in Ethiopia according to Ethnologue, but not all support manuscript cultures. The majority of manuscripts are in Ge'ez, the ancient liturgical language of Ethiopia.

Catalogues of individual collections were written in the nineteenth century, with a key work for the disposition of Ethiopian MSS more widely prepared in 1995 and published by Robert Beylot and Maxime Rodinson.  Since that time, an online inventory has been developed that documents items labelled as “Ethiopian manuscripts’’ in libraries all over the world. This "Inventory of Libraries and Catalogues of Ethiopian Manuscripts" was created in 2008 and is maintained since then by A. Wion, C. Bosc-Tiessé and M.-L. Derat from CNRS (Paris). The list of institutions below is a partial selection of the most prominent and best known collections, giving special attention to the individual researchers involving in forming the collections and those scholars who wrote the catalogues.

British Collections of Ethiopian Manuscripts

Bodleian Library, Oxford 
The early collections in the Bodleian Library at Oxford came from James Bruce, and consisted of 25 Ethiopic manuscripts purchased by the library in 1843. The collection soon grew to 33 manuscripts and these were catalogued and published in 1848 by August Dillmann. Since the mid-nineteenth century the collection has expanded to 130 items. A notable addition in 2002 was an illustrated seventeenth-century manuscript of a Marian text, Arganona Weddase (‘Harp of Praise’) (MS. Aeth.e.28). The uncatalogued manuscripts were revisited in 2007 by Steve Delamarter and Damaqa Berhāna Tafarā.

British Library, London

The founding Ethiopic collections in the British Museum until 1973 and since then in the British Library—74 manuscripts—came from the Church Mission Society and the materials that had been assembled by Karl Wilhelm Isenberg and Johann Ludwig Krapf, missionaries and linguists who travelled to the country between 1839 and 1842. However, some of the collection has an earlier provenance, for example, Extracts from the Chronicle of Axum, written on paper in about 1810 with the book plate of George Annesley, 2nd Earl of Mountnorris. In 1847 the Trustees of the British Museum published a catalogue of the Ethiopian manuscripts that were then under their care. This catalogue was prepared by August Dillmann and included 88 items.

The British Museum collections grew in 1868 when 349 manuscripts came after the British Expedition to Abyssinia against emperor Tewodros II. A catalogue of the enlarged collection was prepared by William Wright (orientalist) and published in 1877. Nine decades later, Stefan Strelcyn reviewed the manuscripts that had come to the British Library after 1877 and published a catalogue of them. The catalogue lists 108 items (some with multiple parts) and covers the general range of Ethiopian literature from Biblical texts to magical and divinatory writings.

The transfer of the India Office collection to the British Library in 1982 brought 6 further manuscripts to the collection, first acquired in 1842 by the India Museum in East India House.

A further collection of 39 manuscripts came to the British Library from Roger Wenman Cowley (1940-1988). Cowley spent 15 years in Ethiopia as an Anglican missionary and teacher, during which time he assembled a collection of Biblical commentaries in Amharic. His MSS consist of copies on paper commissioned by Cowley and executed during the years 1967-77 (except for numbers 19-61, 32, 37, 40-42 and 44 which are copies made at different times in the twentieth century). Cowley used this material in his book Ethiopian Biblical Interpretation, published in 1988.

The British Library is in the process of digitizing and providing its Ethiopian manuscripts online in its Digitzed Manuscripts area (e.g., seventeen of its Täˀammərä Maryam are now online).

Cambridge University Library, Cambridge
The Ethiopic collections at the Cambridge University Library were catalogued by Edward Ullendorff. The individual colleges at Cambridge also hold Ethiopic manuscripts and have given digital access to some of them. The uncatalogued manuscripts were revisited in 2007 by Steve Delamarter and Damaqa Berhāna Tafarā.

Chester Beatty Library, Dublin

The Chester Beatty collection of 58 Ethiopian manuscripts includes illustrated gospel books, psalters and devotional works. Chester Beatty purchased some of the collection at auction in London in the 1930s and bought the rest in the 1950s and later. The manuscripts were studied and published by Cerulli in 1965.

Edinburgh University Library, Edinburgh
The Edinburgh University Library has a small collection of Ethiopic manuscripts acquired from a variety of sources. These are as follows: Or. MS 461-462 Acts of St. George according to Theodotus of Ancyra, with 20 illustrations, between boards; Or. MS 477, Or. MS 644, Or. MS 649, Or. MS 651, Or. MS 654, Or. MS 655 Psalms, Or. MS 656, Psalms, Or. MS 673 Gospels, portion (?), scroll format.

John Rylands Library, Manchester
The John Rylands Library owns 45 items on parchment and paper, dating from the 1600s and later. The majority (31 items) came to the library from the Crawford collection, purchased in 1901. In addition to a copy of the Fetha Nagast (Ge'ez: ፍትሐ ነገሥት) (Ethiopian MS 13) and a deed of Dawit III (Ethiopian MS 28), the collection includes a number of magic scrolls (Ethiopian MSS 29-34).

The first catalogue of the collection was prepared by Stefan Strelcyn and published in 1974. The manuscripts were revisited and published in 2007 by Steve Delamarter and Damaqa Berhāna Tafarā.

Wellcome Collection, London

The Wellcome Collection was catalogued by Stefan Strelcyn and his Catalogue of Ethiopian manuscripts of the Wellcome Institute of the History of Medicine in London, published in 1972, is available online through the Wellcome Library. The Wellcome originally had a collection of 34 manuscripts, acquired between 1913 and 1930.  They retained 16 magico-medical scrolls and 1 divinatory manuscript; the remainder were transferred to the library of the British Museum in 1970 and 1971 and are now in the British Library. According to Strelcyn, the Wellcome material "constitutes and good and very representative collection of this kind of Ethiopian literature." The scrolls are dated to the eighteenth, nineteenth and early twentieth centuries based on Strelcyn's assessment of the palaeography.

European Collections of Ethiopian Manuscripts

Accademia dei Lincei, Rome
The Accademia dei Lincei in Rome holds the collection of 138 manuscripts formed by Carlo Conti Rossini. The catalogue prepared by Stefan Strelcyn includes 30 further manuscripts in the Fonds Caetani. The oldest manuscripts in the collections date to the fifteenth century with some having a provenance of Debre Damo.

Bibliothèque nationale de France, Paris

The collections in the Bibliothèque nationale de France, held primarily in the Département des Manuscrits, have been subject to several cataloguing campaigns. In 1877 a catalogue was published by Hermann Zotenberg and gave an account of the 170 manuscripts then in the collection. The Ethiopic holdings were subsequently enlarged by the three collections, those of d'Abbadie, Casimir Mondon-Vidailhet, and Marcel Griaule which increased the number at BnF to more than 970 manuscripts. Zotenberg's work was accordingly followed by a catalogue of the Mondon-Vidailhet collection prepared by M. Chaine. The Griaule collection was published by Stefan Strelcyn. The BnF has the largest single collection of magico-medical scrolls in France, with over 160 specimens in the Griaule collection.

The Bibliothèque nationale de France has now digitized and provided freely online its collection at Gallica (e.g., the Chronicle of the Kings of Ethiopia).

Schøyen Collection, Oslo 
The Schøyen Collection of Ethiopian material was studied and published by David Appleyard.

Vatican Library
It has the largest collection of Ethiopian manuscripts outside of Ethiopia; many donated in the early modern period. In addition, in the 1990s, private collections of considerable size have been published and acquired by the Vatican Library.

American Collections of Ethiopian Manuscripts

Hill Museum & Manuscript Library, Collegeville, Minn.
The Hill Museum & Manuscript Library is located at and sponsored by Saint John's Abbey and University in Collegeville, Minnesota. The library holds a substantial number of photographs, images and digital copies of Ethiopian manuscripts and is host to the Ethiopian Study Center. The library is also the home for the Ethiopian Manuscript Microfilm Library.

Howard University School of Divinity’s André Tweed Ethiopian Manuscript Collection, Washington, DC
The André Tweed Ethiopian Manuscript Collection is one of the five largest collections in North America and is fully catalogued online. Its collection of 151 codices and 83 scrolls of spiritual healing (also known as magical scrolls) is only surpassed by four larger collections (Christian/Ge'ez unless otherwise noted): The collection at the Department of Semitic and Egyptian Languages / Institute of Christian Oriental Studies at Catholic University in Washington, DC, with 375 codices (of which 177 are Islamic) plus three codex quires and 374 scrolls; the Library of Congress’s Kane collection, with 211 codices and 83 scrolls; UCLA's collection, with 203 codices and 110 scrolls; and Princeton’s collection, with 177+ (some Amharic) and 678 scrolls. The size of the Tweed collection alone makes it important, but in addition to the more common Psalters and service books, the Tweed collection also contains several manuscripts that are of greater significance due to their age and contents. Perhaps the most significant is a  possibly 14th or 15th century Acts of Paul codex.  The Acts of Paul is part of the New Testament Apocrypha. Fragments of a 16th century psalter including illuminations of the Madonna and child, St. George, the trinity, and the annunciation, is the next oldest codex holding. A 17th or 18th century collection of the Minor Prophets with Christian commentary is another significant codex.

André Tweed was an alumnus of Howard University’s Medical School and the first African American board-certified psychiatrist in California. He became interested in Ethiopian manuscripts and artifacts and bought many codices, scrolls of spiritual healing, crosses, and other artifacts during his lifetime. When he became terminally ill with cancer, he sought a permanent, appropriate resting place for his prized possessions. That is how the collection came to be part of Howard University School of Divinity’s (HUSD's) collection.

Because of the lack of awareness of the collection on the part of the scholarly world, it has not been accessed frequently by scholars. However, in the academic year 2005-06, Gay Byron, the Baptist Missionary Training School Professor of New Testament and Christian Origins at Colgate Rochester Crozer Divinity School, traveled to Washington, DC, during her sabbatical year in which her focus was Ge’ez (Classical Ethiopic) and its usefulness for New Testament research, to view the Tweed collection. With the help of Dr. Henry Ferry, formerly Associate Professor of Church History and Associate Dean of HUSD and Dr. Alice Ogden Bellis, Dr. Byron photographed the entire Acts of Paul codex for her own scholarly research.

In addition to the Acts of Paul, the psalter fragment, and Minor Prophets codices, among the older books are the following from the 18th century: a life of St. Cyrus with 53 illuminated portraits, a life of St. Graba, a liturgical text with two illuminated portraits, a treatise on the Trinity, eight Psalters, some with illuminated pages, a Malka Sellasse Trinity, two Mashafa Genzats (burial liturgies), an 18th or 19th century Deggwa (hymnbook) and a second fragment of a Deggwa, a Prayer of Peter along with other religion-magical prayers, another fragment of prayers from a religio-magical text, and a Dersana Michael – four readings for the festival of the Archangel including two 20th century paintings.

Included among the 19th and 20th century codices are a Prayer of St. Simon Stylite, a Book of the Miracles of Mary including several illuminations, an Ecumenical book of Mary with two portraits, several Miracles of Mary and similar texts, a Homily Hymnbook of St. Michael with a drawing of St. Michael and one of Haile Selassie, many Deggwas (hymnbooks), Psalters, various prayer books, various liturgical books, numerous Gospels of Johns, other Gospel books, New Testament collections without the Gospels, and many religio-magical books. In addition to the manuscripts, there are a variety of other artifacts: silver pectoral crosses, processional crosses made of various materials (silver, brass, copper, iron, wood) – some on generally later wooden shafts, silver hand crosses, silver star of David pendants, other necklaces – some made of silver or wooden beads, bracelets, rings, a pocket watch, seals, hair ornaments, coins, artwork of various sorts including a late 15th or early 16th century painted diptych and many other diptychs and triptychs of religious subjects, musical instruments including a lyre, a bronze and wood sistrum (a kind of rattle), a one string violin, a kalimba or  hand piano, eating and drinking vessels such as bowls, vases, water jugs, baskets, and even a horse hair wooden wisk, masks, headrests, stools, and a leather bridle.

Gebra Paulos and Gebra Sarabamon, also known as Tweed 150, was returned to Debre Libanos Monastery on January 11, 2016, by a contingent from the Howard University School of Divinity community, including Dean Alton B. Pollard III, Associate Dean Gay Byron, Professor Alice Ogden Bellis, student Lawrence Rodgers, pastor of a church in Baltimore, and Memher Zebene Lemma, a double alumnus of HUSD and the head priest of Debre Genet MedhaneAlem (Mount Paradise Savior of the World), one of the largest Ethiopian Orthodox churches in the Washington, DC, area. Blain Zerihun, the Administrative Assistant of the Associate Dean and a native Ethiopian, was also on hand for the return of the manuscript.  This was the first time that any major western institution had returned a manuscript from its collection to Ethiopia. 

In October 2012 the Howard University School of Divinity community became officially aware that Tweed 150 had been microfilmed as part of a UNESCO project in 1976 when it was in the Debre Libanos collection in Ethiopia. The microfilms taken at that time matched the digitized images that were made as part of a digitization project led by Professor Bellis with the help of chief consultant Stephen Delamarter, Professor at George Fox Evangelical Seminary and also creator of the Ethiopian Manuscript Imaging Project. The match was made as part of the process of cataloguing the collection as a follow-up to the digitizing project.

Due to complicated legal, political, and cultural issues, it took three years before it was possible to return Gebra Paulos and Gebra Sarabamon to Debre Libanos Monastery. Finally, with the manuscript having only been appraised and insured within days of departure, the Howard contingent flew directly to Addis Ababa on an Ethiopian Air flight courtesy of Ethiopian Air, arriving on Sunday, January 10, 2016. The delegation then proceeded with the manuscript to Debre Libanos Monastery 110 km away. When they arrived, more than two thousand people were there to greet them. The two-hour ceremony included music, dancing, and liturgical readings. The scripture lesson was the story of the Prodigal Son (Luke 15:11-32).

J. Paul Getty Museum, Los Angeles

The J. Paul Getty Museum acquired a single manuscript of the Gospels dating to the early sixteenth century in 2008. A number of the folios are visible online through the museum's website as well as Wikicommons. It has now acquired some others.

Princeton University, Princeton, New Jersey
The core collection of Ethiopic manuscripts at Princeton University was formed by Robert Garrett who collected 113 items in Ge’ez and Amharic and donated them to Princeton University Library in 1942. The collection is fully catalogued online. Included in the collection are Psalters, Miracles of Mary, Prayer books, Homilies of Michael, Synaxaria, Anaphora of Addai and Mari, Missals and Gospels. Divination texts are also part of the collection. One of the Miracles of Mary is among the oldest and probably dates to the seventeenth century; the other materials mostly date to the eighteenth and nineteenth century. Garrett acquired most his Ethiopic manuscripts from Enno Littmann who led expeditions to Tigray Region and Axum in 1905 and 1906. The Princeton collection has continued to grow through gift and purchase, and is especially strong in magico-medical scrolls of which there are now more than 500 specimens.

Of historiographical interest is the pseudepigraphical Book of Enoch (Ge'ez: መጽሐፈ ሄኖክ mätṣḥäfä henok). The Princeton manuscript, according to a stamp on the old binding, belong to Rev. H. C. Reichardt who was in charge of the Damacus mission of the London Society for Promoting Christianity amongst the Jews from 1875 until his resignation in 1881. The manuscript was one of several used by Robert Henry Charles (1855-1931) in his study of the Book of Enoch, and has since been commented on by Erho and Stuckenbruck.

The Princeton Library has now posted most of its Ethiopic manuscripts online at its Treasures of the Manuscript Division online. The finding aid is available as a pdf; currently, none of the manuscripts have MARC records. A report on the collection was written by Princeton librarian Don Skemer. A digital humanities project works on Princeton's Miracles of Mary manuscripts.

UCLA, Los Angeles
The Charles E. Young Research Library at the University of California, Los Angeles had a core collection 64 Ethiopian manuscripts in Ge'ez, Agaw and Amharic. Many were purchased by Wolf Leslau on the library's behalf during his research expeditions to Ethiopia in the 1960s. Subsequently, the library has acquired the extensive collection of Gerald and Barbara Weiner; this consists of 139 manuscripts and 110 scrolls. The Library has made over 50 of their manuscripts visible online in digital format.

University of Oregon, Museum of Natural and Cultural History
The Museum of Natural and Cultural History at the University of Oregon has a small number of manuscripts in its collection pertaining to Ethiopian history and material culture. Most of the objects were gifted by Jayne Bowerman Hall as a tribute to her husband William O. Hall, U.S. Ambassador to Ethiopia from 1967 to 1971. A catalogue of the collection was published in 2000.

Walters Art Museum, Baltimore 

The Walters Art Museum in Baltimore, Maryland has a small collection of manuscripts and Ethiopian art. Digital catalogues of some of this material is available, notably Walters Ms. W.768, Ethiopic Psalter with Canticles, Song of Songs, and two hymns in praise of Mary. Ethiopian Gospels WDL13018 is available entire through Wikicommons.

Ethiopian Collections of Ethiopian Manuscripts 
Thousands of monasteries and churches in Ethiopia have manuscript collections that are not listed here. Below are three of the important ones.

Gunda Gunde Monastery, Tigray Region
The Gunda Gunde monastery is located in the Misraqawi (Eastern) Zone of the northern Tigray Region in Ethiopia. It is known for its prolific scriptorium, and library of Ge'ez manuscripts. This collection of over 220 volumes, all but one dating from before the 16th century, is one of the largest collections of its kind in Ethiopia. The Gunda Gunde Manuscript Project, based at the University of Toronto, seeks to preserve a digitized manuscript collection of the monastery's holdings.

Institute of Ethiopian Studies, Addis Ababa
The Institute of Ethiopian Studies in Addis Ababa has a collection of approximately 1500 manuscripts, still largely uncatalogued as of 2012. However a team led by Alessandro Gori undertook a listing exercise with regard to the Arabic materials and published the results in 2014.

National Archives and Library of Ethiopia, Addis Ababa
National Archives and Library of Ethiopia has a collection of approximately 835 manuscripts, at present largely uncatalogued.

See also
 Ethiopian chant
 Ethiopian historiography

References

External links
 Universitätsbibliothek Johann Christian Senckenberg Frankfurt am Main
 SGD Digital Collection: Previously Unknown and Uncatalogued Ethiopian Manuscripts in North America

Complete manuscripts
 British Library, Illustrated Gospels dating to the late 1600s (Or. MS 481). Note: To see the manuscript click through from this page at the bottom to Turning the PagesTM.
 Cambridge, Trinity College, Pslater (B.13.9).
 Princeton University Library, Book of Enoch, Mäṣḥafä Henok (C0744.03, Garrett Ethiopic Manuscripts, no. 42).
 UCLA Library, Digital Collections, a selection of 51 manuscripts visible online.
 Walters Art Museum, Illustrated Gospels dating to the 1500s (Walters MS W850).

Manuscripts by area
Gospels
Gospel Books
Biblical manuscripts
Ethiopian art
African chronicles